The 2019 JLT Community Series was the Australian Football League (AFL) pre-season competition played before the 2019 home and away season. It featured 18 matches across two weekends. For the sixth year in a row, the competition did not have a grand final or overall winner. All matches were televised live on Fox Footy as well as on the AFL Live app.

Results

References

JLT Community Series
Australian Football League pre-season competition